Jamie Bernadette Watkins (born December 14, 1987) is an American actress and occasional producer. She has appeared in many horror films.

Early life
Watkins was born and raised in Kankakee, Illinois. She is the youngest of nine children, five sisters and four brothers. Her father died four months after her birth, leaving her mother to raise all of the children on her own with very limited means. Watkins dreamed of being on the big screen since she was around five years old. She watched movies repeatedly and acted out the scenes, mimicking the actresses she loved. Watkins began acting in Community Theater productions at about age 10 and did some theater in high school as well. She studied acting at Margie Haber Studios and the Van Mar Academy of Motion Picture and Television Acting.

Career
Watkins came to a crossroads in her life when she had the choice to stay in her beloved hometown, settle down and get married, or venture out to Los Angeles where dreams of acting awaited her. She came to the decision to try out Hollywood and left with $600 in her pocket and drove across the country by herself.

Her first roles include the thriller Son of Sam and the short Struck (both 2008), co-starring Kelly Preston and Jenna Elfman. In 2009, she had a bigger role besides David Carradine in Absolute Evil. Since 2010, she was seen in more popular movies such as MILF (2010), Axeman (2013), What Now (2015), starring Ice-T, Mortdecai (2015), starring Johnny Depp, Jem and the Holograms (2015), and The Darkness (2016), starring Kevin Bacon. She also appeared in an episode of The Neighbors.

In 2016, she starred in Let's Be Evil and All Girls Weekend. She also played the starring role in I Spit on Your Grave: Deja Vu (2019).

Filmography
Son of Sam (2008)
Struck (2008)
Absolute Evil (2009)
MILF (2010)
Celebrity Sex Tape (2012)
Reel Evil (2012)
Axeman (2013)
The Neighbors (2014)
The Bunnyman Massacre (2014)
Mortdecai (2015)
Jem and the Holograms (2015)
Hot Bot (2016)
Sinbad and the War of the Furies (2016)
A Week in London (2016)
The Darkness (2016)
Let's Be Evil (2016)
All Girls Weekend (2016)
The Interview (2017)
American Satan (2017)
Smothered by Mothers (2019)
I Spit on Your Grave: Deja Vu (2019)
The Furnace (2019)
Dead By Dawn (2020)

Awards
 Recipient of the 2017 Best Actress Award by the Independent Cinema Foundation and Festival Academy (ICFFA)
 Best Actress in a feature film for The 6th Friend at the 2016 Freak Show Horror Film Festival
 Best Actress in a feature film for The 6th Friend at the 2016 RIP Horror Film Festival, 
 Nominated Best Original Screenplay of a feature film for The 6th Friend at the 2017 Madrid International Film Festival
 Best Feature Film for The 6th Friend at the 2016 Freak Show Horror Film Festival    
 Best Horror Feature Film for The 6th Friend at the 2017 Independent Filmmakers Showcase IFS Film Festival
 Best Ensemble for feature film Smothered by Mothers at the 2017 New York Film Awards

References

External links

Living people
American actresses
1987 births
21st-century American women